Princeton is an unincorporated community in Bossier Parish, Louisiana, United States. It is part of the Shreveport-Bossier City Metropolitan Statistical Area.  The ZIP Code for Princeton is 71067.

George Dement, the mayor of Bossier City from 1989 to 2005, was born in a farmhouse in Princeton in 1922.

References 

Unincorporated communities in Louisiana
Unincorporated communities in Bossier Parish, Louisiana
Unincorporated communities in Shreveport – Bossier City metropolitan area
Populated places in Ark-La-Tex